Kirsty Louise Bowden (born 21 February 1978) is a female British former field hockey player who competed in the 2000 Summer Olympics. She represented England and won a silver medal, at the 1998 Commonwealth Games in Kuala Lumpur.

References

External links
 

1978 births
Living people
British female field hockey players
Olympic field hockey players of Great Britain
Field hockey players at the 2000 Summer Olympics
Commonwealth Games medallists in field hockey
Commonwealth Games silver medallists for England
Field hockey players at the 1998 Commonwealth Games
Medallists at the 1998 Commonwealth Games